Katte is a surname. Notable people with the surname include:

 Adriaan Katte (1900–1991), Dutch field hockey player
 Hans Hermann von Katte (1704–1730), Prussian Army lieutenant
 Walter Katte (1830–1917), British-born American civil engineer

See also
 Kattel